Marcelo Garcés Gallo (born 8 June 2000) is a Peruvian footballer who plays as a forward.

Career

Club career
Garcés played for Alianza Lima and Esther Grande in his youth years, before joining Deportivo Municipal in 2018. In the summer 2019, he was promoted to the first team. On 12 October 2019, Garcés got his official in the Peruvian Primera División for Deportivo Municipal against Ayacucho FC. Garcés started on the bench, before replacing Matías Succar in the 81st minute. At the end of November 2021 Deportivo Municipal confirmed, that Garcés would leave the club at the end of the year.

References

External links
 

Living people
2000 births
Association football forwards
Peruvian footballers
Peruvian Primera División players
Deportivo Municipal footballers